The X film series consists of American slasher-horror films based on an original story written by Ti West. The series includes an  original film, its  prequel, and its sequel. The overall plot of the movies centers around two characters, Maxine Minx and Pearl, both portrayed by Mia Goth.

The first film, X, was met with critical acclaim, and was a success at the box office. A tribute to slasher films of the past, the picture was deemed a horror film classic and impactful, anticipating its influence on the future of the genre. Its prequel received strong positive reception from critics, with some stating that it inadvertently improved the premise of the previous installment, and was also a success at the box office.

A third film is in pre-production.

Films

X (2022)

In 1979 America, a team of amateur filmmakers are determined to create a new experience in cinema with an exploration in the adult film industry. Burlesque show owner and developer Wayne Gilroy decides that he will produce the project under his own conception, and hires a young and inexperienced director, RJ Nichols, whose reserved girlfriend Lorraine Day assists with the technical needs during the photography. Wayne's younger girlfriend, aspiring actress Maxine Minx stars in the production, alongside pornographic stars Bobby-Lynne Parker and Jackson Hole. While on the road trip to rural Texas the group have their differences, but ultimately put these aside as Wayne believes that they will attain riches and fame with this project's innovation.

When they arrive at their remote location, an isolated cabin that Wayne rented from its elderly owners Howard and his ailing wife Pearl, they immediately begin production. Unbeknownst to the owners, they continue their sexual debauchery while Lorraine, at the discomfort of RJ, decides to take part in appearing in climatic final scene as well. All the while, curiosity leads Pearl to investigate the cabin, only to find the sensual activities of the team. Jealous of their youth and sexuality, angered by her aging body, and longing for a time when she too sought stardom, the aged woman begins a rampage upon them one by one. When Howard learns of what has been happening on his property, he helps his wife in her mission to slaughter the young film crew. As a massacre begins to unfold, the group fight to survive the night.

Pearl: An X-traordinary Origin Story (2022)

In 1918 America, Pearl is a young and ambitious woman with desires for celebrity on a national scale. An avid fan of motion pictures and dancing, she expresses her desires to become a star to her family. Though her husband is away in the military during World War I, she stays at the home of her parents, must abide by their reserved and strict expectations, and attend to their farm. Her German mother Ruth discounts her aspirations, disapproves of their exploitive nature, and orders that she complete chores while she lives in their home. This includes caring for her father who uses a wheelchair and is unable to speak. Though she initially sees the farm animals as her friends and converses with them as though they are human, she begins to take out her frustrations on them and begins slaughtering them to appease her inner rage.

Despite these restrictions, Pearl often sneaks away to the local movie theater where she can escape the cares of her day and fantasize her dreams of a future different from the life she's living. Over time the projectionist at the moviehouse, starts a flirtatious and lustful relationship with her. When he shows her an early-iteration of a pornographic movie albeit silent in nature, and tells her that he wants to see her in something similar one day, she once again begins to believe that one day she will be a star. Her thirst for sexual interaction continue to be suppressed as she attends the needs of the farm. All the while, her mother tells her that something is wrong with her, with outbursts of unacceptable psychopathic and sociopathic tendencies emerging. As their differences escalate, and Pearl allows her true antisocial desires to release. As she commits to becoming a serial killer through murderous acts, she inadvertently seals her fate in order to avoid a criminal homicide investigation. She struggles to come to terms with the reality that she will never achieve her goals, never reach her dreams, and always have to remain anonymous at the family farm she inherits as a consequence of her actions.

MaXXXine (TBA)
In March 2022, West announced that he is currently working on the script for a third movie in the film series, which will be set chronologically after the events of X. The project will explore another sub-genre of horror and will continue the depiction of cinema's influence on society, exploring how the development of home video releases did so. West states, while a viewer can watch each movie independently without seeing the previous film, they are made to "complement each other". In describing his creative processes during the development of these films, West stated: "I'm trying to build a world out of all this, like people do these days." The filmmaker further expressed that: "You can't make a slasher movie without a bunch of sequels".

In June 2022, executive producer Peter Phok confirmed that a third film is officially in development with West attached to the project. In September 2022, at the first Midnight Madness showing of Pearl for the 2022 Toronto International Film Festival, a third film was officially announced with a short teaser played after the post-credits. The clip was later released online for those not present at the event. West once again serves as writer/director and one of the producers, while Mia Goth will reprise her role from the first movie. Taking place in 1985 and titled MaXXXine, the plot was confirmed to center around Maxine, the only survivor of the "Massacre of X" as she continues to pursue her future in Hollywood. Though principal photography has not yet begun, the teaser trailer was shot with the film fast-tracked to being green-lit by A24, following the successes of the previous two installments. Jacob Jaffke, Kevin Turen, and Harrison Kreiss will be producers, while Goth will additionally serve as an executive producer.

In January 2023, Goth stated that the script is complete and that the story is in her opinion the best of the series, so far. The actress stated that many of the previous production team are returning, with principal photography scheduled to commence later that year.

Development 
Writer/director Ti West developed the film series as a study and analysis of mankind's desires for fame and fortune. Each movie will explore the associated horrors through a slightly different lens. X was created as a tribute to, and in the style of, the original installment of The Texas Chainsaw Massacre franchise. While it details the rise of independent filmmaking and its influence on society, the prequel film explored another style within the genre.

Filmed back-to-back with the first installment, Pearl was filmed as a secret prequel, with photography taking place in New Zealand. Once the announcement of the movie was made, it was already in the post-production stage. A sneak preview was also shown in X'''s post-credits scene for North American releases only. The filmmaker created the project with the intention of its being a mix between melodramas and technicolor films, described as "a demented Disney movie". Exploring the rise of classic Hollywood film productions, West intended to detail its influences on societal shift and changes.

Likewise, the third installment titled MaXXXine'' will implement another sub-genre of filmmaking, and a different era with a variant of horror sub-genre as well. The project will explore the creation of home video, rentals, and video stores. Each installment is intended to portray human relations as a result of the media they consume.

Cast and characters

Additional crew and production details

Reception

Box office and financial performance

Critical and public response

References 

Horror film franchises
Film series introduced in 2022
Trilogies